George Baillie-Hamilton-Arden, 11th Earl of Haddington,  (26 July 1827 – 11 June 1917), was a Scottish landowner and representative peer.

Life

Lord Haddington was the son of George Baillie-Hamilton, 10th Earl of Haddington, and Georgina Markham.

Lord Haddington was elected a representative peer from 1874 until his death. He was High Sheriff of Cheshire in 1871. He was created Lord Lieutenant of Haddingtonshire in 1874. He was honorary Colonel of the Lothians and Border Horse and an officer in the Royal Company of Archers.

In 1886, he was elected a Fellow of the Royal Society of Edinburgh. His proposers were Sir Thomas Grainger Stewart, Robert Grey, Sir William Turner, and Peter Guthrie Tait. He resigned from the Society in 1892.

Lord Haddington was appointed a Knight of the Order of the Thistle (KT) in the 1902 Coronation Honours list published on 26 June 1902, and was invested by King Edward VII at Buckingham Palace on 8 August 1902.

He lived at Tyninghame House near Prestonkirk in East Lothian.

Marriage and issue
On 17 October 1854, he married Helen Katharine Warrender (1834–1889). The marriage produced seven children:

Isabel Baillie-Hamilton (d. 1859)
Lady Ruth Baillie-Hamilton (1855–1941)
George Baillie-Hamilton, Lord Binning (1856–1917)
Lt. Hon. Richard Baillie-Hamilton (1858–1881)
Lady Grisell Baillie-Hamilton (1861–1957)
Captain Hon. Henry Robert Baillie-Hamilton-Arden (1862–1949)
Lady Cecely Baillie-Hamilton (1868–1950)

His eldest son George predeceased him by a few months, dying in January 1917, and so the title passed to his grandson George Baillie-Hamilton, 12th Earl of Haddington.

References

Sources
 Balfour Paul, Sir J., Scots Peerage IX vols. Edinburgh 1904.

1827 births
1917 deaths
11
Knights of the Thistle
Lord-Lieutenants of East Lothian
Scottish representative peers
Governors of the Bank of Scotland
High Sheriffs of Cheshire
Members of the Royal Company of Archers
George
Place of birth missing
Place of death missing
19th-century Scottish businesspeople